Trimethoprim/sulfamethoxazole, (also known as Cotrimoxazole) sold under the brand name Bactrim among others, is a fixed-dose combination antibiotic medication used to treat a variety of bacterial infections. It consists of one part trimethoprim to five parts sulfamethoxazole. It is used to treat urinary tract infections, methicillin-resistant Staphylococcus aureus (MRSA) skin infections, travelers' diarrhea, respiratory tract infections, and cholera, among others. It is used both to treat and prevent pneumocystis pneumonia and toxoplasmosis in people with HIV/AIDS and other causes of immunosuppression. It can be given by mouth or intravenously.

Trimethoprim/sulfamethoxazole is on the World Health Organization's List of Essential Medicines and is also available as a generic medication. In 2020, it was the 121st most commonly prescribed medication in the United States, with more than 5million prescriptions.

Medical uses

Pneumocystis jirovecii pneumonia 
Trimethoprim/sulfamethoxazole (TMP/SMX) is the medicine most commonly used to prevent Pneumocystis jirovecii pneumonia (PCP) People who get Pneumocystis pneumonia have a medical condition that weakens their immune system, like HIV/AIDS, or take medicines (such as corticosteroids) that reduce the body's ability to fight bacterial and viral infections. People with HIV/AIDS are less likely to get Pneumocystis pneumonia as a result of antiretroviral therapy (ART). However, Pneumocystis pneumonia is still a substantial public health problem. Most of what is scientifically known about Pneumocystis pneumonia and its treatment comes from studying people with HIV/AIDS.

Susceptibility
Organisms against which trimethoprim/sulfamethoxazole can be effective include:

 Acinetobacter spp.
 Aeromonas spp.
 Alcaligenes/Achromobacter spp.
 Bartonella henselae
 Bordetella pertussis (pertussis)
 Brucella spp.
 Burkholderia cepacia
 Burkholderia mallei (glanders)
 Burkholderia pseudomallei (melioidosis)
 Chlamydia spp.
 Chryseobacterium meningosepticum
 Citrobacter spp.
 Enterobacter spp.
 Enterococcus spp.
 Escherichia coli
 Haemophilus spp.
 Hafnia alvei
 Kingella spp.
 Klebsiella granulomatis
 Klebsiella pneumoniae
 Legionella spp.
 Listeria monocytogenes (listeriosis)
 Moraxella catarrhalis
 Morganella morganii
 Mycobacterium tuberculosis (tuberculosis)
 Neisseria gonorrhoeae (gonorrhoea)
 Neisseria meningitidis (meningococcal disease)
 Nocardia spp.
 Plesiomonas shigelloides
 Pneumocystis jirovecii
 Proteus mirabilis
 Proteus vulgaris
 Providencia rettgeri
 Providencia stuartii
 Salmonella typhi (typhoid fever)
 Non-typhi (food poisoning) Salmonella
 Serratia spp.
 Shigella spp.
 Staphylococcus aureus
 Staphylococcus epidermidis
 Staphylococcus saprophyticus
 Stenotrophomonas maltophilia
 Streptococcus agalactiae
 Streptococcus pneumoniae
 Streptococcus pyogenes
 Streptococcus viridans
 Toxoplasma gondii (toxoplasmosis)
 Tropheryma whippelii (Whipple's disease)
 Vibrio cholerae (cholera)
 Yersinia enterocolitica
 Yersinia pestis (bubonic plague)
 Yersinia pseudotuberculosis

The only notable nonsusceptible organisms are Pseudomonas aeruginosa, the mycoplasmae and Francisella tularensis (the causative organism of tularaemia).

Pregnancy and breast feeding
Its use during pregnancy is contraindicated, although it has been placed in Australian pregnancy category C. Its use during the first trimester (during organogenesis) and 12 weeks prior to pregnancy has been associated with an increased risk of congenital malformations, especially malformations associated with maternal folic acid deficiency (which is most likely related to the mechanism of action of co-trimoxazole) such as neural tube defects such as spina bifida, cardiovascular malformations (e.g. Ebstein's anomaly), urinary tract defects, oral clefts, and club foot in epidemiological studies. Its use later on during pregnancy also increases the risk of preterm labour (odds ratio: 1.51) and low birth weight (odds ratio: 1.67). Animal studies have yielded similarly discouraging results.

It appears to be safe for use during breastfeeding as long as the baby is healthy.

Babies 
Its use in those less than 2 months of age is not recommended due to the risk of adverse side effects.

Adverse effects

Common side effects include nausea, vomiting, rash, and diarrhea. Severe allergic reactions and Clostridium difficile infection may occasionally occur. Its use in pregnancy is not recommended. It appears to be safe for use during breastfeeding as long as the baby is healthy. Trimethoprim/sulfamethoxazole generally results in bacterial death. It works by blocking the making and use of folate by the microorganisms.

Contraindications 
Contraindications include the following:

 Known hypersensitivity to trimethoprim, sulphonamides or any other ingredients in the formulations
 Pregnancy
 Severe hepatic failure, marked liver parenchymal damage or jaundice.
 Serious haematological disorders and porphyria (due to the sulfonamide component of the preparation).
 Severe chronic kidney disease (CrCl <15 ml/min) where repeated measurements of the plasma concentration cannot be performed
 Co-trimoxazole should not be given to neonates during the first 6 weeks, except for the treatment/prophylaxis of Pneumocystis jirovecii (P. carinii) in infants of four weeks of age or greater.

Interactions 

Its use is advised against in people being concomitantly treated with:

 ACE inhibitors like captopril, enalapril, lisinopril, perindopril, and ramipril due to the potential for additive hyperkalaemic effects
 Prilocaine — additive risk of methaemoglobinaemia
 Antiarrhythmics like amiodarone (increased risk of ventricular arrhythmias) and dofetilide (increased risk of QT interval prolongation)
 Antibacterials like dapsone (increases plasma levels of both drugs), methenamine (increased risk of crystalluria) and rifampicin (as it may lead to an increased plasma level of rifampicin and lower plasma levels of trimethoprim)
 Anticoagulants like warfarin and acenocoumarol — anticoagulant effects of either drug is potentiated by this combination
 Sulfonylureas — effects enhanced
 Phenytoin, half-life of phenytoin is increased
 Antifolates like pyrimethamine, proguanil and methotrexate increase the risk of associated side effects like bone marrow toxicity, folic acid supplementation should be considered. A significant risk of megaloblastic anaemia exists with doses of pyrimethamine in excess of 25 mg/wk.
 Antivirals, more specifically, lamivudine (increased plasma concentrations of lamivudine), zalcitabine (increased plasma concentrations of zalcitabine) and zidovudine (increased risk of haematological reactions)
 Procainamide and/or amantadine may have their plasma concentrations increased bilaterally or unilaterally.
 Clozapine and other antipsychotics — increased risk of haematological side effects
 Nucleoside analogue antineoplastics like azathioprine and mercaptopurine — increased risk of haematological toxicity
 Digoxin — increase in digoxin levels in a proportion of elderly patients
 Diuretics — elderly patients receiving thiazide diuretics are at a heightened risk for developing thrombocytopaenia while on co-trimoxazole
 Ciclosporin — patients who have received a kidney transplant and are receiving co-trimoxazole and ciclosporin concomitantly are at an increased risk of having a reversible deterioration in their kidney function.
Spironolactone — concurrent use can increase the likelihood of hyperkalemia, especially in the elderly. The trimethoprim portion acts to prevent potassium excretion in the distal tubule of the nephron.
 Potassium aminobenzoate — effects of sulfonamides (like sulfamethoxazole) inhibited.
 Laboratory tests — trimethoprim and sulfonamides have been reported to interfere with diagnostic tests, including serum-methotrexate and elevated serum creatinine levels, also urea, urinary glucose and urobilinogen tests.

Overdose
Likely signs of toxicity include:

 Nausea
 Vomiting
 Dizziness
 Headache
 Mental depression
 Confusion
 Thrombocytopenia
 Uremia
 Bone marrow depression
 Loss of appetite
 Colic
 Drowsiness
 Unconsciousness

The recommended treatment for overdose includes:
 Administration of activated charcoal
 Stomach pumping
 General supportive measures
 Haemodialysis, which is moderately effective in clearing co-trimoxazole from the plasma.
 Calcium folinate treatment in cases of blood dyscrasias
 Forcing oral fluids
Alkalinisation of the urine may reduce the toxicity of sulfamethoxazole, but it may increase the toxic effects of trimethoprim.

Pharmacology

The synergy between trimethoprim and sulfamethoxazole was first described in the late 1960s. Trimethoprim and sulfamethoxazole have a greater effect when given together than when given separately, because they inhibit successive steps in the folate synthesis pathway. They are given in a one-to-five ratio in their tablet formulations so that when they enter the body their concentration in the blood and tissues is roughly one-to-twenty — the exact ratio required for a peak synergistic effect between the two.

Sulfamethoxazole, a sulfonamide, induces its therapeutic effects by interfering with the de novo (that is, from within the cell) synthesis of folate inside microbial organisms such as protozoa, fungi and bacteria. It does this by competing with p-aminobenzoic acid (PABA) in the biosynthesis of dihydrofolate.

Trimethoprim serves as a competitive inhibitor of dihydrofolate reductase (DHFR), hence inhibiting the de novo synthesis of tetrahydrofolate, the biologically active form of folate.

Tetrahydrofolate is crucial in the synthesis of purines, thymidine, and methionine which are needed for the production of DNA and proteins during bacterial replication. Thus the net effect of each of these drugs is a bacteriostatic halt in replication. When combined, TMP and SMX are bactericidal.

The effects of trimethoprim causes a backlog of dihydrofolate (DHF) and this backlog can work against the inhibitory effect the drug has on tetrahydrofolate biosynthesis. This is where the sulfamethoxazole comes in; its role is in depleting the excess DHF by preventing it from being synthesised in the first place.

Co-trimoxazole was claimed to be more effective than either of its components individually in treating bacterial infections, although this was later disputed. Because it has a higher incidence of adverse effects, including allergic responses, its use has been restricted in many countries to very specific circumstances where its improved efficacy has been demonstrated. It may be effective in a variety of upper and lower respiratory tract infections, kidney and urinary tract infections, gastrointestinal tract infections, skin and wound infections, sepsis, and other infections caused by sensitive organisms. Co-trimoxazole decreases the risk of recurrence of retinochoroiditis. The global problem of advancing antimicrobial resistance has led to a renewed interest in the use of co-trimoxazole more recently.

Society and culture

Legal status

Trade names
Trimethoprim/sulfamethoxazole may be abbreviated as SXT, SMZ-TMP, TMP-SMX, TMP-SMZ, or TMP-sulfa.

Co-trimoxazole (British Approved Name (BAN)) is manufactured and sold by many different companies. The following list of brand names is incomplete:

 Bactrim, Bactrimel (manufactured by Roche and distributed in Europe)
 Bactrom (Venezuela)
 Bibactin (manufactured by PPM and distributed in Cambodia and some African countries)
 Biseptol
 Sumetrolim
 Co-trimoxazole (Sandoz)
 Cotrim
 Deprim (AFT Pharmaceuticals)
 Diseptyl (Israel)
 Graprima Forte Kaplet (manufactured by PT Graha Farma and distributed in Indonesia)
 Infectrin, Bactrim (Brazil)
 Novo-Trimel
 Primotren (Lek in Slovenia and other countries)
 Resprim
 Sanprima (manufactured by PT Sanbe Farma and distributed in Indonesia)
 Septra (Aspen Pharmacare and formerly GlaxoSmithKline)
 Septram (Panama)
 Septran (GlaxoSmithKline)
 Septrin (Spain)
 Sulfatrim
 Teva-Trimel
 Trisul
 Vactrim (manufactured and distributed in Laos)

Economics
Trimethoprim/sulfamethoxazole is relatively inexpensive as of 2019.

References

External links 
 

Acetaldehyde dehydrogenase inhibitors
Combination antibiotics
Pfizer brands
GSK plc brands
Novartis brands
Hoffmann-La Roche brands
World Health Organization essential medicines
Wikipedia medicine articles ready to translate